The men's 400 metres event was part of the track and field athletics programme at the 1924 Summer Olympics. This race was depicted in the film Chariots of Fire. The competition was held on Thursday, July 10, 1924, and on Friday, July 11, 1924.

As for all other races the track was 500 metres in circumference.

Sixty runners from 27 nations competed. No nation had more than 4 athletes.

Background

This was the seventh appearance of the event, which is one of 12 athletics events to have been held at every Summer Olympics. The defending gold medalist from 1920, Bevil Rudd of South Africa, did not return; the other two medalists, silver-winning Guy Butler of Great Britain and bronze-winning Nils Engdahl of Sweden, did. Eric Liddell of Great Britain was the 1924 Scottish and AAA champion.

Argentina, Australia, Brazil, Bulgaria, Haiti, Ireland, Mexico, Poland, and Switzerland appeared in the event for the first time. The United States made its seventh appearance in the event, the only nation to compete in it at every Olympic Games to that point.

Competition format

The competition retained the basic four-round format from 1920. The first round had 17 heats, ranging from 1 to 5 athletes. The top two runners in each heat advanced to the quarterfinals. There were 6 quarterfinals, intended to have 5 or 6 runners in each but sometimes having 4 due to withdrawals; the top two athletes in each quarterfinal heat advanced to the semifinals. The semifinals featured 2 heats of 6 runners each. The top two runners in each semifinal heat advanced, making a six-man final.

Records

These were the standing world and Olympic records (in seconds) prior to the 1924 Summer Olympics.

(*) 440 yards (= 402.34 m)

In the quarterfinals, Josef Imbach set a new Olympic record with 48.0 seconds. In the semifinals Horatio Fitch improved the Olympic record with 47.8 seconds. In the final, Eric Liddell set a new world record with 47.6 seconds; this time was ratified as a 400 metres world record as Ted Meredith ran his record over 440 yards. World Athletics rescinded Liddell's time as a world record in 1928.

Schedule

Results

Round 1

All heats were held on Thursday, July 10, 1924, and started at 2 p.m.

The best two finishers of every heat qualified for the quarter-finals.

Heat 1

Heat 2

Heat 3

Heat 4

Heat 5

Heat 6

Heat 7

Heat 8

Heat 9

Heat 10

Heat 11

Heat 12

Heat 13

Heat 14

Heat 15

Heat 16

Heat 17

Quarterfinals

All quarter-finals were held on Thursday, July 10, 1924, and started at 4 p.m.

The best two finishers of every heat qualified for the semifinals.

Lajos Kurunczy and Erik Åström qualified for the quarterfinals but withdrew.

Quarterfinal 1

Quarterfinal 2

Quarterfinal 3

Quarterfinal 4

Quarterfinal 5

Quarterfinal 6

Semifinals

All semi-finals were held on Friday, July 11, 1924, and started at 2:45 p.m.

The best three finishers of each heat qualified for the final.

Semifinal 1

Semifinal 2

Final

The final was held on Friday, July 11, 1924, and started at 5:30 p.m. Taylor's ankle gave out just before the finish line in a career-ending injury; he crawled across the line. Imbach tripped over the lane-dividing ropes, fell, and was unable to finish.

References

External links
Olympic Report
 

400 metres
400 metres at the Olympics